Extremities is a 1986 American drama film directed by Robert M. Young and written by William Mastrosimone, based on his 1982 off-Broadway play of the same name. The film stars Farrah Fawcett, Alfre Woodard, Diana Scarwid, and James Russo.

Both Fawcett and Russo had appeared in the stage play (Fawcett taking over a role originated by Susan Sarandon), and Fawcett received a Golden Globe nomination for Best Actress for her performance in the film.

Plot
While getting into her car one night, Marjorie is attacked at knifepoint by a masked assailant who forces her to drive to a remote location, where he tries to sexually assault her. She manages to flee but leaves her purse behind. While at the police station, she is told that without a positive identification of her attacker, it will be her word against his, and he will likely not face any criminal charges. In the following days, Marjorie lives in continued fear. Meanwhile, her attacker, revealed to be Joe, uses the information from her purse to find out where she lives and also steals mail from the home she shares with her roommates, Pat and Terry, to gain insight into their lives. One morning, while Pat and Terry are away at work, Joe casually enters her home, claiming he is looking for someone who owes him money. Marjorie quickly realizes he is the man who attacked her  and tries to escape, but Joe overpowers her. Throughout the day, Joe repeatedly physically and psychologically abuses her. As he attempts to rape her, Marjorie manages to subdue him by spraying wasp repellent into his eyes. As she tries to flee once again, Joe taunts her by saying that since he did not actually rape her, the police will let him go, and he vows to come back and kill her. Marjorie binds him, confines him in the fireplace, and plans to murder him. When Pat and Terry return home, they try to convince Marjorie to think of the consequences of her decision and to go to the police. Joe tries to manipulate them into turning against Marjorie and believing that he is the victim. As Marjorie tries to force Joe to confess to what he has done to her, he claims that he and Marjorie were lovers and that she attacked him when he came to end their relationship. Marjorie removes the knife he previously used on her from his jacket, as well as the mail he stole. She threatens to castrate him if he does not admit the truth. Defeated, Joe confesses that he intended to kill Marjorie, as well as Pat and Terry. He also confesses to raping and murdering three prior women. Marjorie, finally at peace, tells Pat and Terry to alert the police.

Cast

Reception
Extremities received mixed reviews from critics. The film holds a 40% rating on Rotten Tomatoes based on ten reviews.

Award nomination
For her performance, Fawcett received a 1986 Golden Globe nomination for Best Actress in a film drama.

The film was named one of the Worst Films of 1986 by Siskel and Ebert.

Home media
Extremities was released to Blu-ray and DVD on May 19, 2015 as a Region 1 widescreen disc.

References

External links
 
 
 
 Review at TV Guide

1986 films
1986 drama films
American films based on plays
American drama films
Atlantic Entertainment Group films
Films directed by Robert M. Young
Films set in Los Angeles
Home invasions in film
American rape and revenge films
Films scored by J. A. C. Redford
1980s English-language films
1980s American films